The Philippine Super Liga conference results presents the final rankings of each conference in PSL, a commercial volleyball league in the Philippines founded in 2013.

Indoor Volleyball

Women's 

continued

Men's

Beach Volleyball

Women's 

continued

Men's 

continued

External links
https://web.archive.org/web/20170308232247/http://philippinesuperliga.com/wp/ - official website
http://sportscore.com.ph/index.html - SportsCore Event Management and Consultancy, Inc.

Philippine Super Liga